The First National Bank of Florida is a bank headquartered in Milton, Florida, with branches in Pensacola, Pace, Navarre and Destin. It is not to be confused with the First National Bank of Miami which became Southeast Banking Corporation which later failed in 1992.

References

External links
 First National Bank of Florida home page

Banks based in Florida